

Number format
National Significant Numbers (NSN):
The minimum number length (excluding the country code) is 5 digits.

Numbering Plan in Vanuatu

See also 
 Telecommunications in Vanuatu

References

Vanuatu
Communications in Vanuatu